Holts Corner is an unincorporated community in Marshall County, in the U.S. state of Tennessee.

History
Variant names were "Holtland" and "Holts Corners". A post office called Holts Corners was established in 1856, the name was changed to Holts Corner in 1886, and the post office closed in 1905. Besides the post office, the community once had two country stores.

References

Unincorporated communities in Marshall County, Tennessee
Unincorporated communities in Tennessee